Ramelau Futsal Clube is a East Timorese futsal club based in Dili City, East Timor. The team was founded in 2016 and competes in the Pra Liga Futsal Timor-Leste.

Achievements

Domestic competitions
 
Pra Liga Futsal Timor-Leste
Champion: 2020–21
Taça 30 de Agosto
Champion: 2016
Taça F-FDTL
Runner-up: 2017

International competitions
AFF Futsal Cup
Group stage: 2022

Appearances in International Competitions

2022 AFF Futsal Cup

Ramelau made his debut in the AFF competition in the 2022 season. Joined in Group B with Sahako from Vietnam, and Selangor MAC from Malaysia. In his first match on 4 September 2022 which was held at Terminal 21 Korat in Nakhon Ratchasima, Ramelau was defeated by Sahako with a score of 2–0. Then in their second match against Selangor MAC on 5 September 2022, Ramelau lost 0–6.

Here are the results of Ramelau matches in 2022 AFC Futsal Cup;

Players

Current squad

Sponsorship
The following are Ramelau sponsors from the 2016 to 2022 seasons;

References

Futsal clubs in East Timor
Sport in East Timor
Futsal clubs established in 2016
2016 establishments in East Timor